William Boteler (ca. 15401602) was an English politician.

He was a Member (MP) of the Parliament of England for Lyme Regis in 1563 and Bedford in 1586.

Notes

References
 

1540 births
1602 deaths
English MPs 1563–1567
English MPs 1586–1587
People from Biddenham